Johnson is an unincorporated town in Montgomery Township, Gibson County, Indiana, United States roughly 4 miles west of Owensville and 8 miles north of Poseyville. It should not be confused with Johnson County, Indiana which is in a different location and named for a different figure or nearby Johnson Township which is also named for a different figure, likely the same as the county.

History
A post office was established at Johnson in 1914, and remained in operation until it was discontinued in 1930. The community was named for Mr. Johnson, a railroad official.
The original site was just one of many villages for the Native American tribe of Piankeshaw.

Geography

References

Unincorporated communities in Gibson County, Indiana